The Perishers were a Swedish indie rock band. The band formed in 1997 with six members. The lineup since 2001, has consisted of Ola Klüft (vocals, guitar), Martin Gustafson (keyboards, backing vocals), Pehr Åström (bass), and Thomas Hedlund (drums).
 
In 2005, the band was personally handpicked by Sarah McLachlan to open her second leg of the Afterglow tour. Each night of the tour, Sarah McLachlan joined the band and sang background vocals on their song "Pills". The live track was released as a promotional CD single and as an online exclusive EP via Tower Records later that year.

Additionally, several of their songs have been played in episodes of the American television programs The O.C., One Tree Hill, Greek and Veronica Mars. In Veronica Mars, the ballad "Sway" featured prominently in a climactic episode of the series' second season.

Sarah Isaksson (Klüft's former vocal teacher) is a featured artist on their song "Pills". Their song "My Heart" has been played on Saturn Sedan commercials as well as a second-season episode of the ABC Family series Kyle XY. Another song, "Trouble Sleeping", was played in a promotional spot for Grey's Anatomy; the song "Come Out of the Shade" was featured in an episode of the show.

In 2010 the band broke up when the lead vocalist, Ola Klüft, left the group in order to perform under the name A Lanky Swede - he released his first solo album on 14 April 2011.

Members
Ola Klüft – vocals, guitar
Martin Gustafson – keyboards, backing vocals
Pehr Åström – bass
Thomas Hedlund – drums (also drums for Deportees (band), Phoenix (band) and Cult Of Luna)

Discography

Studio albums
 From Nothing to One (2002)
 Let There Be Morning (2003)
 Victorious (2007)

EPs
 Sway EP (2005)
 Pills (Live) EP (2005)

Live albums
 The Perishers Live (2005)

Other
 Demo (2000)

Cover songs
 Blue Christmas
 When Tomorrow Comes

Singles
 The Night
 My Home Town
 When I Wake Up Tomorrow
 In The Blink Of An Eye
 Sway
 Let There Be Morning
 Pills feat. Sarah McLachlan (Live)
 Trouble Sleeping
 Carefree
 Come Out Of The Shade
 Victorious

Non-album tracks
 All Wrong
 Blur
 Honestly
 Not Anymore
 Our Days Are Here
 Sleep Tight
 The Best Days
 I Hope You'll Be Missing Me (Like I Will Miss You)

Songs in other media

References

External links 
The Perishers on Myspace

Swedish indie rock groups